MacBeath may refer to:
Alexander Murray MacBeath (1923–2014), British mathematician
Andrew MacBeath 20th century Scottish preacher
Jimmy MacBeath (1894–1972),  itinerant worker and singer of Bothy Ballads from the northeast of Scotland
John MacBeath (c. 1880 – 1967), Scottish Baptist preacher